The Caudron C.640 Typhon was a 1930s French high-speed single-seat monoplane utility aircraft built by Caudron-Renault.

History
Similar in concept to the de Havilland DH.88 Comet the Typhon (en: Typhoon) was designed by Georges Otfinovsky and Marcel Riffard for use on long-range postal routes. The first aircraft first flew on 17 June 1935. The aircraft was a twin-engined low-wing cantilever monoplane of wooden construction.  Seven C.640s were built.  The Typhon established 5000 km speed records.  It was not a success in operation as its flexible wings experienced buffeting and vibration problems.

Variants
C.640 Typhon - production model with Renault 6Q engines, 7 built.
C.641 Typhon - record breaking version with raised canopy and increased fuel capacity, 2 built.
C.670 Typhon - prototype high-speed bomber version with a crew of three, similar to the C.640 but with increased dimensions and weights, one built.

Operators

French Air Force

Romanian Air Force

Specifications (C.640)

See also

References
Notes

Further reading

External links

Photo at Aviafrance

1930s French mailplanes
1930s French civil utility aircraft
C.640
Low-wing aircraft
Aircraft first flown in 1935
Twin piston-engined tractor aircraft